Dogfish Pictures is an American film production, finance and strategy company founded by James Belfer in 2009 that specializes in independent films.

Staff
James Belfer, founder/producer
Michelle Soffen, founder/associate producer

Films

References

American film studios
Entertainment companies based in New York City
2009 establishments in New York City